West Endicott Hose Company No. 1 is a historic fire station located at West Endicott, Broome County, New York. It was built in 1926–27 by the Endicott Johnson Corporation as a part of its "Square Deal" program.  It is a three-story, rectangular steel frame building, clad in red brick and cast stone.  It is five bays wide by 12 bays deep.  The front facade features second and third story porches supported by brick piers.  The building also houses recreational facilities used by the local community.

It was listed on the National Register of Historic Places in 2015.

References

Fire stations on the National Register of Historic Places in New York (state)
Government buildings completed in 1927
Buildings and structures in Binghamton, New York
National Register of Historic Places in Broome County, New York